Martin Kenzie (29 April 1956 – 16 July 2012) was a  British second unit director and cinematographer whose works include feature films such as The Shining (1980), Return of the Jedi (1983), Aliens (1986), The King's Speech (2010) and TV series including Rome (2005) and Game of Thrones (2012). He was a member of the British Society of Cinematographers as a Camera Operator and was later elected a "Full Member of the Society" with BSC accreditation in 2012. Kenzie was diagnosed with cancer and was being operated on with the help of Macmillan Cancer Support. He died on 16 July 2012 at the age of 56. The Game of Thrones season three premiere episode, "Valar Dohaeris", aired on 31 March 2013, was dedicated to the memory of Kenzie in the credits.

Personal life and career
Kenzie was born on 29 April 1956 in Cambridge, England and started his career as a production runner for a London-based TV Commercials Company named "Picture Palace Productions". Later he worked for the camera department at "Samuelson Film Services" while preparing motion picture cameras for hire. His first feature film work was for Stanley Kubrick's The Shining (1980) where he worked as an assistant cameraman with film's cinematographer John Alcott. Till 1984, Kenzie continued to work as a Second assistant camera on various films including Return of the Jedi (1983), Indiana Jones and the Temple of Doom (1984) and A Passage to India (1984).

Kenzie worked as First assistant camera on various other successful movies such as Robert Zemeckis' Who Framed Roger Rabbit (1988), Ron Howard's Willow (1988), Clint Eastwood's White Hunter Black Heart (1990), Francis Ford Coppola's The Godfather Part III (1990) and David Fincher's Alien 3 (1992). Since the beginning of his career, Kenzie made significant contributions as a Second unit director. Alongside feature films, Kenzie also worked for Television. His first work as a main unit cinematography which credited him as a cinematographer came in 1998 with David L. Williams's short film Angels at My Bedside and for a feature film in 2007 with Chris Munro's comedy film Back in Business.

For 2005's film Syriana, written and directed by Stephen Gaghan, Kenzie worked as an assistant director and contributed as cinematographer for various television series including Keen Eddie (2003–2004), Rome (2005), Game of Thrones (2012) and Playhouse Presents (2012). In 1998, Kenzie joined Associate Membership of the British Society of Cinematographers as a Camera Operator and with his progression as a Director of Photography, he was later elected a "Full Member of the Society" with BSC accreditation in 2012.

Kenzie was diagnosed with cancer and was being operated on with the help of Macmillan Cancer Support. He died on 16 July 2012 at the age of 56. British Society of Cinematographers announced a memorial service to celebrate Kenzie's life on 2 September 2012. The television series Game of Thrones dedicated its season three premiere episode, "Valar Dohaeris", aired on 31 March 2013, to the memory of Kenzie in the credits. Kenzie had worked as a cinematographer for the series for four of its episodes from second season; "Garden of Bones", "The Ghost of Harrenhal", "The Old Gods and the New", "A Man Without Honor"; and had done additional photography for two episodes; "Blackwater", "Valar Morghulis". Kenzie's work for the series was appreciated for its varied use of "subtle color palettes" based on the specific times and places of the story-line. After Kenzie's death, JustGiving started a fundraising campaign for him which would provide support for Cancer Research UK for the betterment of treatments for further patients.

Awards
British Society of Cinematographers
1997 GBCT Operators Award – Hamlet
2001 GBCT Operators Award – Band of Brothers 

Constellation Awards
2012 Best Technical Accomplishment in a 2012 Science Fiction Film or Television Production – Game of Thrones – Nominated

Creative work

Feature films

Television films/series

References

External links
 
 Martin Kenzie filmography @ Hollywood.com
 Martin Kenzie filmography @ Turner Classic Movies

1956 births
2012 deaths
British cinematographers
Deaths from cancer in England